Henry Viley Johnson (August 6, 1852 – June 29, 1931) was an American lawyer and politician who served as the Mayor of Denver from 1899 to 1901.

Biography
Johnson was born in Scott County, Kentucky, in 1852 and earned degrees from Georgetown College and the University of Kentucky. He moved to Denver in 1886 and worked as a lawyer. 

Johnson was the United States Attorney for the District of Colorado from 1893 to 1897, and later served as the Mayor of Denver from April 1899 to April 1901.

Johnson was married and had four children;
 Junius W. Johnson (1878–1933), a civil engineer
 Henry "Harry" V. Johnson (1881–1966), a physician
 Margaret Johnson Harrison (1893–1987)
 Tom Loftin Johnson (1900–1963), a noted artist

Johnson, who was a cousin of Tom L. Johnson, Mayor of Cleveland, died in Denver in 1931 after contracting pneumonia.

Notes

References

External links

1852 births
1931 deaths
People from Scott County, Kentucky
Georgetown College (Kentucky) alumni
University of Kentucky alumni
Colorado lawyers
Colorado Democrats
Mayors of Denver
United States Attorneys for the District of Colorado
Burials at Fairmount Cemetery (Denver, Colorado)